Andries Maurice Jean Marie Baron Van den Abeele (born April 12, 1935 in Bruges) is a Belgian historian and historical preservationist and former entrepreneur, politician and employers' organization chairman.

Van den Abeele studied philosophy and the arts at the Université de Namur, and the University of Leuven. He was corporate director of Van den Abeele N.V. from 1960 to 1997. He is married and has three children.

Politics  
As a member of the Christian People's Party (Christelijke Volkspartij, abbr. CVP) he was a member of the municipal council of Bruges from 1965 to 1982. He was also alderman of finance and urban renewal from 1972 to 1977.

In 1992, he switched to Flemish Liberals and Democrats (Vlaamse Liberalen en Democraten, abbr. VLD), and from 1994 to 1996 he was again a municipal councilor.

Historical preservation and writings 
In 1965 he erected with friends the Marcus Gerards Association in order to preserve and renovate the architectural conservation in the city of Bruges.

Van den Abeele wrote a lot about urban renewal, historical preservation and the history of the city of Bruges. He also wrote about Freemasonry.

References

External link

  
  Andries Van den Abeele at the Digital Library for Dutch Literature

1935 births
Living people
Barons of Belgium
Belgian corporate directors
Christian Democratic and Flemish politicians
Politicians from Bruges
Flemish historians
Flemish nobility
Historical preservationists
Open Vlaamse Liberalen en Democraten politicians
Writers from Bruges
Université de Namur alumni